Hortense T. Ferne (1885–1976) was an American artist. Her work is included in the collections of the Smithsonian American Art Museum, the Nelson-Atkins Museum of Art, the Philadelphia Museum of Art, the Chrysler Museum of Art, the Mattatuck Museum and the Metropolitan Museum of Art, New York.

References

1880s births
1976 deaths
20th-century American women artists
Artists from New York City